Nautsi was a rural locality in Pechengsky District of Murmansk Oblast, Russian SFSR, Soviet Union. It lies on the east bank of the Paatsjoki River, which forms part of the border between Norway and Russia.

History
Prior to World War II, Nautsi belonged to Finland. Finnish forces retreated to this location in 1939 during the Winter War. During World War II, Germany sought to capture this area because of the nearby nickel mines.

Nautsi became a part of the Soviet Union in 1945. It was officially abolished on December 13, 1962.

References

Abolished inhabited localities in Murmansk Oblast